Exit Theatre, sometimes stylized as EXIT, is an independent theatre in Zagreb, Croatia whose productions are mainly oriented towards adults. The theatre has won hundreds of awards and frequently performs abroad. In 2009, it was declared as one of top Croatian brands.

History
The theatre was founded on 23 September 1994 by Matko Raguž and Nataša Lušetić and is currently located in Ilica 208, the location they hold since 1998 by adapting an old cinema. The theatre's original productions cover important social themes and are described as being based on a "process-oriented collaboration of all those involved". The theatre sees itself as a common workshop, with all contributing parties holding equal authorship. The theatre had a major impact on the Croatian theatre scene during the nineties, but subsequently entered financial troubles, after which it began staging productions for children, producing successful dramatisations of Adrian Mole.

Legacy
The theatre was received exceptionally well and it and its plays have earned numerous awards including the City of Zagreb award twice. Some plays, such as Kauboji have been performed 500 times.

References

External links
Official page

Theatres in Zagreb
1994 establishments in Croatia